Zeilbach may refer to:

Zeilbach, Feldatal, a district of the community Feldatal in Hesse, Germany
Zeilbach (Werra), a river of Thuringia, Germany, tributary of the Werra